Pollhill is a hamlet in the parish of Harrietsham near the town of Maidstone in Kent, England.

References

External links

Hamlets in Kent